Janusz Zbigniew Zabłocki (18 February 1926 – 13 March 2014) was a Polish politician, journalist, Catholic activist, lawyer, soldier of Armia Krajowa.

Life
He was born in Grodzisk Mazowiecki.
He studied law at the Jagiellonian University, from 1945 to 1949, and political science from 1946 to 1948.

He was a member of 
PAX Association (1950–1955)
 Club of Catholic Intelligentsia (1957–1976)
 Polish Club of Catholic Intelligentsia (1976–1981; as a chairman 1977–1981)
 Polish Catholic Social Union (since 1981; as a chairman 1981–1984)
 Labor Party (1989)
 Znak (1977–1981)
 advisory council (Rada Konsultacyjna) of Przewodniczący Rady Państwa (1969–1989).

He was a member of the Sejm (1965–1985), co-founder of Ośrodek Dokumentacji i Studiów Społecznych (1967), co-founder of Christian-Democratic Party 'Unity' (in 1990), co-founder and editor of Więź, Chrześcijanin w Świecie and Ład.

Works
 Prymas Stefan Wyszyński. Opór i zwycięstwo 1948–1956 (2002).

Notes

References

External links

1926 births
2014 deaths
Place of death missing
People from Grodzisk Mazowiecki
People from Warsaw Voivodeship (1919–1939)
Polish Roman Catholics
PAX Association members
Members of the Polish Sejm 1965–1969
Members of the Polish Sejm 1969–1972
Members of the Polish Sejm 1972–1976
Members of the Polish Sejm 1976–1980
Members of the Polish Sejm 1980–1985
20th-century Polish lawyers
Polish non-fiction writers
Polish male non-fiction writers
Polish publicists
Home Army members
Recipients of the Order of Polonia Restituta (1944–1989)